Damiano del Barbiere  was an Italian stuccoist and sculptor of the Renaissance period, recruited by Primaticcio to help in the labors at the palace of Fontainebleau.

See also
School of Fontainebleau

References

Italian sculptors
Italian male sculptors
Renaissance sculptors
Year of death unknown
Year of birth unknown